Joan Scott may refer to:
Joan Wallach Scott (born 1941), American historian
Joan LaCour Scott (1921–2012), American screenwriter
Joan Scott (actress) (1920–1997), British actress in Sleeping Murder
Joan Canning, 1st Viscountess Canning (née Scott, 1771–1816), wife of George Canning
Joan McKowen, born Joan Scott, Australian ice hockey figure